Huayllabamba District is one of seven districts of the province Urubamba in Peru.

See also 
 Ch'akiqucha
 Hatun Luychu
 Machu Qullqa
 Q'illuqucha
 Yanaqucha

References